Mike Giallombardo (born October 1982) is an American politician, businessman, and current Chief Warrant Officer (CW2) serving as a member of the Florida House of Representatives from the 77th district. He assumed office on November 3, 2020.

Early life and education 
Representative Giallombardo was raised in Cape Coral, Florida. He earned an Associate of Science degree from Georgia Military College, a Bachelor of Arts in Criminal Justice from Florida Atlantic University, and a Master of Arts in International Relations from American Military University. As an undergraduate, Giallombardo was a middle linebacker for the Florida Atlantic Owls football team under coach Howard Schnellenberger.

Military career 
After college, Representative Giallombardo enlisted in the United States Army and was deployed to Iraq in support of Operation Iraqi Freedom. During his deployment, he served with the 4th Infantry Division and supported special operation missions. Representative Giallambardo played a significant role as a liaison to the Iraqi military and other coalition forces supporting the counter insurgency effort in Iraq. Mike is highly decorated from operations he took part in and was awarded numerous medals including the Army Commendation and Army Achievement Medals for his operational roles in Iraq that led to capturing various targets.

After leaving active duty, Representative Giallombardo continued his service in the and Florida Army National Guard. Representative Giallombardo is currently a Chief Warrant Officer (CW2) and serves as the State Emergency Response Team liaison for the State of Florida. He has been activated for multiple hurricanes working with multiple counties in ensuring that the citizens have support from the Florida National Guard.

Political career 
He was elected to the Florida House of Representatives in November 2020 and recently announced he will be seeking re-election in 2022 in the renamed 79th district. The 79th district was previously the 77th district, which primarily encompasses the city of Cape Coral, Florida. He currently is assigned to the following committees:

 Regulatory Reform Subcommittee - Vice Chair
 Pandemics & Public Emergencies Committee
 State Affairs Committee
 Local Administration & Veterans Affairs Subcommittee
 Insurance & Banking Subcommittee
 State Administration & Technology Appropriations Subcommittee

Representative Giallombardo has sponsored or co-sponsored the following bills:

Business career 
In 2014, he founded Total Intelligence Group, Inc., a private intelligence firm that focuses on cybersecurity. In 2020, he co-founded IRIS Tech along with Army Veterans Tim Masshardt and Jason Shea. IRIS Tech is responsible for the creation of the IRIS platform currently being used by law enforcement agencies throughout the United States.

References 

1982 births
Living people
People from Cape Coral, Florida
Florida Atlantic University alumni
Florida Atlantic Owls football players
United States Army reservists
Republican Party members of the Florida House of Representatives
Asian-American people in Florida politics